"Life Is a Fear" is a single by British indie rock band, Editors. The song is the fifth track and the third single off of their fifth studio album, In Dream, and was released through PIAS Recordings on 12 August 2015.

Music video 
Rahi Rezvani, who also directed the band's singles, "No Harm" and "Ocean of Night" also directed the music video for "Life Is a Fear". The music video features the band in a monochrome room with lasers shining on them driving a car. The music video was released one day prior to the official single release, on 11 August 2015. In describing the music video, Rezvani explained that "I am a black and white person, un-scared of dividing the world in good and bad. When you have a past like mine, you don't have time to think in shades of gray."

Charts

References

External links
 

2015 songs
Editors (band) songs
Music videos directed by Rahi Rezvani
PIAS Recordings singles
Songs written by Edward Lay
Songs written by Russell Leetch
Songs written by Tom Smith (musician)
Songs written by Justin Lockey
Songs written by Elliott Williams